Gay White Way may refer to:

 Broadway (theatre), originally referred to electric illumination, later used to reference homosexuality in relation to Broadway theater
 The Gay White Way (1907), musical by Ludwig Engländer
 Gay White Way (1928), an Elmer Rice production
 "On the Gay White Way", a song from the 1942 film My Gal Sal; see Hermes Pan
 "On the Gay White Way", a song from the 1952 film With a Song in My Heart